Jasper County is the name of eight counties in the United States of America. All are named in honor of Sergeant William Jasper, a hero of the Revolutionary War.  Five counties share a boundary with a Newton County, named for John Newton, a similarly distinguished soldier. Two have their county seat named Newton.

The following counties are called Jasper County:

Lists of counties of the United States
United States county name disambiguation pages